The Butterfield Overland Mail Route Lucian Wood Road Segment is a historic stretch of road in Crawford County, Arkansas. It is a  segment of Lucian Wood Road, extending northward from a junction with Armer Lane in Cedarville. This road section appears to closely follow the original alignment of the main road in the region in 1839, which connected Fayetteville and Van Buren. This road was used by the Butterfield Overland Mail service between 1858 and 1861, along what was described as one that route's roughest sections.

The road was listed on the National Register of Historic Places in 2009.

See also
National Register of Historic Places listings in Crawford County, Arkansas

References

Roads on the National Register of Historic Places in Arkansas
Buildings and structures completed in 1858
Transportation in Crawford County, Arkansas
National Register of Historic Places in Crawford County, Arkansas
Butterfield Overland Mail in Arkansas